CBS News is the news division of the American television and radio service CBS. CBS News television programs include the CBS Evening News, CBS Mornings, news magazine programs CBS News Sunday Morning, 60 Minutes, and 48 Hours, and Sunday morning political affairs program Face the Nation. CBS News Radio produces hourly newscasts for hundreds of radio stations, and also oversees CBS News podcasts like The Takeout Podcast. CBS News also operates a 24-hour digital news network.

Up until April 2021, the president and senior executive producer of CBS News was Susan Zirinsky, who assumed the role on March 1, 2019. Zirinsky, the first female president of the network's news division, was announced as the choice to replace David Rhodes on January 6, 2019. The announcement came amid news that Rhodes would step down as president of CBS News "amid falling ratings and the fallout from revelations from an investigation into sexual misconduct allegations" against CBS News figures and Rhodes.

On April 15, 2021, CBS Television Stations and CBS News announced that their respective divisions would merge into one entity, to be named CBS News and Stations. It was also announced that Neeraj Khemlani (former Executive Vice President of Hearst Newspapers) and Wendy McMahon (former President of the ABC Owned Television Stations Group) were named presidents and co-heads. This transition was completed on May 3.

History
In 1929, the Columbia Broadcasting System began making regular radio news broadcasts—five-minute summaries taken from reports from the United Press, one of the three wire services that supplied newspapers with national and international news. In December 1930 CBS chief William S. Paley hired journalist Paul W. White away from United Press as CBS's news editor. Paley put the radio network's news operation at the same level as entertainment, and authorized White to interrupt programming if events warranted. Along with other networks, CBS chafed at the breaking news embargo imposed upon radio by the wire services, which prevented them from using bulletins until they first appeared in print. CBS disregarded an embargo when it broke the story of the Lindbergh kidnapping in 1932, using live on-the-air reporting. Radio networks scooped print outlets with news of the 1932 presidential election.

In March 1933, White was named vice president and general manager in charge of news at CBS. As the first head of CBS News, he began to build an organization that soon established a legendary reputation.

In 1935, White hired Edward R. Murrow, and sent him to London in 1937 to run CBS Radio's European operation. White led a staff that would come to include Richard C. Hottelet, Charles Collingwood, William L. Shirer, Eric Sevareid, Bill Downs, John Charles Daly, Joseph C. Harsch Cecil Brown, Elmer Davis, Quincy Howe, H. V. Kaltenborn, Robert Trout, and Lewis Shollenberger.

"CBS was getting its ducks in a row for the biggest news story in history, World War II", wrote radio historian John Dunning.

In 1940, William S. Paley recruited Edmund A. Chester from his position as Bureau Chief for Latin America at the Associated Press to coordinate the development of the international shortwave radio Network of the Americas (La Cadena de las Americas) in 1942. Broadcasting in concert with the assistance of the Department of State, the Office for Inter-American Affairs chaired by Nelson Rockefeller and Voice of America as part of President Roosevelt's support for Pan-Americanism, this CBS radio network provided vital news and cultural programming throughout South America and Central America during the World War II era.  Through its operations in twenty nations, it fostered benevolent diplomatic relations between the United States and other nations in the region while providing an alternative to Nazi propaganda.

Television
Upon becoming commercial station WCBW (channel 2, now WCBS-TV) in 1941, the pioneer CBS television station in New York City broadcast two daily news programs, at 2:30 p.m. and 7:30 p.m. weekdays, anchored by Richard Hubbell (journalist). Most of the newscasts featured Hubbell reading a script with only occasional cutaways to a map or still photograph. When Pearl Harbor was bombed on December 7, 1941, WCBW (which was usually off the air on Sunday to give the engineers a day off), took to the air at 8:45 p.m. with an extensive special report. The national emergency even broke down the unspoken wall between CBS radio and television. WCBW executives convinced radio announcers and experts such as George Fielding Elliot and Linton Wells to come down to the Grand Central studios during the evening and give information and commentary on the attack. The WCBW special report that night lasted less than 90 minutes. But that special broadcast pushed the limits of live television in 1941 and opened up new possibilities for future broadcasts. As CBS wrote in a special report to the Federal Communications Commission (FCC), the unscheduled live news broadcast on December 7 "was unquestionably the most stimulating challenge and marked the greatest advance of any single problem faced up to that time."

Additional newscasts were scheduled in the early days of the war. In May 1942, WCBW (like almost all television stations) sharply cut back its live program schedule and the newscasts were canceled, since the station temporarily suspended studio operations, resorting exclusively to the occasional broadcast of films. This was primarily because much of the staff had either joined the service or were redeployed to war related technical research, and to prolong the life of the early, unstable cameras which were now impossible to repair due to the wartime lack of parts.

In May 1944, as the war began to turn in favor of the Allies, WCBW reopened the studios and the newscasts returned, briefly anchored by Ned Calmer, and then by Everett Holles. After the war, expanded news programs appeared on the WCBW schedule – whose call letters were changed to WCBS-TV in 1946 – first anchored by Milo Boulton, and later by Douglas Edwards. On May 3, 1948, Edwards began anchoring CBS Television News, a regular 15-minute nightly newscast on the CBS television network, including WCBS-TV. It aired every weeknight at 7:30 p.m., and was the first regularly scheduled, network television news program featuring an anchor (the nightly Lowell Thomas NBC radio network newscast was simulcast on television locally on NBC's WNBT—now WNBC—for a time in the early 1940s and the previously mentioned Richard Hubbell, Ned Calmer, Everett Holles and Milo Boulton on WCBW in the early and mid-1940s, but these were local television broadcasts seen only in New York City). NBC's offering at the time, NBC Television Newsreel (which premiered in February 1948), was simply film footage with voice narration.

In 1948, CBS Radio's seasoned journalist Edmund Chester emerged as the television network's new Director of News Special Events and Sports. Soon thereafter in 1949, he collaborated with one of CBS' original Murrow Boys named Larry LeSueur to produce the innovative news series United Nations In Action. Underwritten by the Ford Motor Company as a public service, these broadcasts endeavored to provide live coverage of the proceedings of the United Nations General Assembly from its interim headquarters in Lake Success, New York. They proved to be highly successful and were honored with the prestigious George Foster Peabody Award for Television News in 1949.
        
In 1950, the name of the nightly newscast was changed to Douglas Edwards with the News, and the following year, it became the first news program to be broadcast on both coasts, thanks to a new coaxial cable connection, prompting Edwards to use the greeting "Good evening everyone, coast to coast." The broadcast was renamed the CBS Evening News when Walter Cronkite replaced Edwards in 1962. Edwards remained with CBS News with various daytime television newscasts and radio news broadcasts until his retirement on April 1, 1988.

CBS News ran cable channel CBS Eye on People from 1997 to 2000 and Spanish-language channel CBS Telenoticias from 1996 to 1998.

In 2021, CBS News had set up its own production unit See It Now Studios, to be headed up by Susan Zirinsky.

In 2022, CBS News hired former Donald Trump administration official Mick Mulvaney as a paid on-air contributor. Mulvaney's hiring stirred controversy within the company due to his history of promoting Trump's false claims and attacking the press. CBS News co-president Neeraj Khemlani told CBS morning show staff: "If you look at some of the people that we've been hiring on a contributor basis, being able to make sure that we are getting access to both sides of the aisle is a priority because we know the Republicans are going to take over, most likely, in the midterms".

Broadcast history

The information on programs listed in this section came directly from CBS News in interviews with the Vice President of Communications and NewsWatch Dallas.

According to the CBS News Library and source Sandy Genelius (Vice President, CBS News Communications), the "CBS Evening News" was the program title for both Saturday and Sunday evening broadcasts. The program title for the Sunday late night news beginning in 1963 was the "CBS Sunday Night News". These titles were also seen on the intro slide of the program's opening. The program airs on Saturday, and Sunday nights at 7:00 p.m.–7:30 p.m. UTC (Eastern Time) on CBS.

CBS News television programs

Current news programs
CBS Overnight News (September 21, 2015 – present)
CBS Morning News (October 4, 1982 – present)
CBS Evening News (July 1, 1941 – present)
CBS Mornings (September 7, 2021 – present)
CBS Saturday Morning (September 18, 2021 – present)
CBS Weekend News (May 7, 2016 – present)
48 Hours (January 19, 1988 – present)
CBS News Sunday Morning (January 28, 1979 – present)
Face the Nation (November 7, 1954 – present)
60 Minutes (September 24, 1968 – present)
CBS News Flash (August 2021 – present)

Early morning news program history
 CBS News Nightwatch (1982–1992)
 CBS Morning News (1982–present)
 CBS Up to the Minute (1992–2015)
 CBS Overnight News (2015–present)

Morning news program history
Calendar (1961-1963)
CBS Morning News (1963–1987)
In the News (1971–1986; 1997–1998)
30 Minutes (1978-1982)
The Morning Program (1987)
CBS This Morning (1987–1999; 2012–2021)
The Early Show (1999–2012)
CBS News Saturday Morning (1997–1999)
The Saturday Early Show (1999–2012)
CBS This Morning Saturday (2012–2021)
CBS Mornings (2021–present)
CBS Saturday Morning (2021–present)
CBS News Sunday Morning (1979–present)

Evening/prime time news program history
CBS Evening News (July 1, 1941 – present)
West 57th (Meredith Vieira, John Ferrugia) (August 13, 1985 – September 9, 1989)
48 Hours (January 19, 1988–present)
60 Minutes II (January 13, 1999 – September 2, 2005)
America Tonight (Dan Rather, Charles Kuralt, Lesley Stahl, Robert Krulwich, Edie Magnus) (October 1, 1990 – 1991)
Street Stories (Ed Bradley; January 9, 1992 – June 10, 1993)
Eye to Eye with Connie Chung (June 17, 1993 – May 25, 1995)
Public Eye with Bryant Gumbel (October 1, 1997 – 1998)
CBS Newsbreak (1976–2009)
Who's Who (1977)
Person to Person (1953–1961; 2012; 2022–present)

Other programs
You Are There (1953–1973)
Adventure (1953–1955)
Youth Takes a Stand (1953–1954)
Air Power (1956–1957)
The Twentieth Century (1957–1970)
CBS Reports (1959–2010)
Of Black America (1968)
In The News (1971–1986; 1997–1998)
Razzmatazz (1977–1982) (co-production with Scholastic Magazines, Inc.)
West 57th (1985–1989)
America Tonight (1990–1991)
20th Century with Mike Wallace (1993–2001)
Biography (1996–2005)
Off Tenth (1997)
Fast Forward (1997–1999)
Scandal! (1998–2007)
BET Nightly News (2001–2005) (co-production with BET Studios)
TV Land Legends: The 60 Minutes Interviews (2002–2004) (co-production with TV Land)
TV Land Moguls (2004–2009) (co-production with TV Land)
What's Hot! What's Cool! (2004)
365gay News (2005–2009) (co-production with Logo TV)
Secret Lives of Women (2005–2009) (co-production with CBS Eye Productions and Kaos Entertainment)
Commander Castle (2006)
FutureCar (2007)
Eco-Tech (2007) (co-production with Beanfield Productions and Silent Crow Arts)
Brink (2008–2009) (co-production with CBS Eye Productions)
48 Hours on ID (2010–present)
Juicy and Jaded (2012) (co-production with Euphoric Entertainment)
60 Minutes Sports (2013–2017) (co-production with Showtime Networks)
Brooklyn DA (2013)
Whistleblower (2018–2019) (co-production with CBS Studios)
The FBI Declassified (2020–present)
Boiling Point (2021–present) (co-production with BET Studios)
Indivisible: Healing Hate (2022) (co-production with XG Productions)
Gilshaine: Partner in Crime (2022) (co-production with Fremantle)
60 Minutes More (1996-1997)
60 Minutes+ (2021–2022)
11 Minutes (2022)

CBS News Radio

The branch of CBS News that produces newscasts and features to radio stations is CBS News Radio. The radio network is the oldest unit of CBS and traced its roots to the company's founding in 1927, and the news division took shape over the decade that followed. The list of CBS News correspondents (below) includes those reporting on CBS News Radio.

CBS News Radio produces the oldest daily news show on radio or television, the CBS World News Roundup, which first aired in 1938 and celebrated its 80th anniversary in 2018. The World News Roundup airs twice every weekday: a morning edition is anchored by Steve Kathan and produced by Paul Farry, while a "late edition" is anchored by Dave Barrett and produced by James Hutton. The evening Roundup, previously known as The World Tonight, has aired in its current form since 1956 and has been anchored by Blair Clark, Douglas Edwards, Dallas Townsend and Christopher Glenn (Glenn also anchored the morning Roundup before his death in 2006).

The CBS Radio Network provides newscasts at the top of the hour, regular updates at :31 minutes past the hour, the popular Newsfeeds for affiliates (including WCBS and KYW) at :35 minutes past the hour, and breaking news updates when developments warrant, often at :20 and :50 minutes past the hour. Skyview Networks handles the distribution.

CBS Newspath
CBS Newspath is CBS News' satellite news-gathering service (similar to CNN Newsource). Newspath provides national hard news, sports highlights, regional spot news, features and live coverage of major breaking news events for affiliate stations to use in their local news broadcasts. The service has a team of domestic and global correspondents and freelance reporters dedicated to reporting for affiliates, and offers several different national or international stories fronted by reporters on a daily basis. CBS Newspath also relies heavily on local affiliates sharing content. Stations will often contribute locally obtained footage that may be of national interest. It replaced a similar service, CBS News NewsNet.

Network News Service (NNS) is a pioneering news organization formed by ABC NewsOne, CBS Newspath and Fox NewsEdge.

CBS News Streaming Network

CBS News Streaming Network is a 24-hour streaming news channel available from the CBS News website and launched on November 4, 2014 as CBSN. At the time as CBSN, the channel features live news from 9a.m. to midnight on weekdays. The channel makes all of the resources of CBS News available directly on digital platforms with live, anchored coverage 15 hours each week. It is a first for a U.S. 24-hour news channel to forgo cable and be available exclusively only online and on smart devices such as smart TV's Apple TV, Roku, Amazon Fire and others. The channel is based at CBS's New York City headquarters.

News bureaus

Domestic bureaus
New York City (Main​ Headquarters)
Washington, D.C. (Evening​ News​ Headquarters/White​ House​ Bureau)
Atlanta
Chicago
Dallas
Denver
Los Angeles (West​ Coast​ Bureau)
Miami
San Francisco
Kennedy Space Center

Foreign bureaus

Europe
London
Rome
Paris
Africa
Johannesburg
Middle East
Istanbul
Asia
Kabul
Beijing
Tokyo
Bangkok

Personnel

Current television hosts, anchors, correspondents, and reporters
New York (Main​ Headquarters)

Enrique Acevedo – Correspondent, 60 Minutes+
Sharyn Alfonsi – Correspondent, 60 Minutes
Jim Axelrod – National Correspondent
Errol Barnett – Transportation Correspondent
Nikki Battiste – National Correspondent
David Begnaud – Correspondent, CBS This Morning
James Brown – Special Correspondent
 Nancy Chen – Correspondent
John Dickerson – Correspondent, 60 Minutes
Tony Dokoupil – Co-Anchor, CBS Mornings
Jericka Duncan – Correspondent, CBS Mornings (2013–present); Anchor, CBS Weekend News (Sunday)
Vladimir Duthiers – Correspondent; Anchor, CBS News Streaming Network 
Jeff Glor – Co-Anchor, CBS Saturday Mornings
Anne-Marie Green – Anchor, CBS Morning News (2013–present); Anchor, CBS News Streaming Network
Peter Greenberg – Travel Editor
Dana Jacobson – Co-Anchor, CBS Saturday Morning
Gayle King – Co-Anchor, CBS Mornings (2012–present)
Dr. Jonathan LaPook – Chief Medical Correspondent
Anthony Mason – Culture Correspondent
Michelle Miller – Co-Anchor, CBS Saturday Morning
Erin Moriarty – Correspondent, 48 Hours and CBS News Sunday Morning
Meg Oliver – Correspondent (2006-2009; 2015–present)
Jane Pauley – Anchor, CBS News Sunday Morning (2016–present)
Scott Pelley – Correspondent, 60 Minutes (1989–present)
Elaine Quijano – Anchor, CBS News Streaming Network
Tanya Rivero – Anchor, CBS News Streaming Network
Mo Rocca – Correspondent, CBS Sunday Morning
Richard Schlesinger – Correspondent, 48 Hours (1984–present)
Tracy Smith – Correspondent, 48 Hours and CBS News Sunday Morning (2000–present)
Lesley Stahl – Co-editor, 60 Minutes (1972–present)
Martha Teichner – Correspondent, CBS News Sunday Morning  (1977–present)
Peter Van Sant – Correspondent, 48 Hours
Anna Werner – Consumer and Investigative Correspondent, CBS This Morning
Bill Whitaker – Correspondent, 60 Minutes (1984–present)
Lana Zak – Anchor, CBS News Streaming Network

Washington, D.C. (Evening​ News​ Headquarters/White​ House​ Bureau)

Rita Braver – Senior Correspondent, CBS News Sunday Morning (1972–present)
Margaret Brennan – State Department Correspondent; Anchor, Face the Nation (2012–present)
Nancy Cordes – Chief White House Correspondent (2007–present)
Robert Costa – Chief Election and Campaign Correspondent (2022–present)
Jan Crawford – Chief Legal Correspondent (2005–2006; 2009–present)
Major Garrett – Chief Washington Correspondent (2011–present); Host, The Takeout (CBS News Streaming Network)
Catherine Herridge – Senior Investigative Correspondent  (2019–present)
Weijia Jiang – Senior White House Correspondent
Nikole Killion – Congressional Correspondent
Scott MacFarlane – Congressional Correspondent
David Martin – National Security Correspondent (1983–present)
Norah O'Donnell – Anchor, CBS Evening News (2019–present)
Ed O'Keefe – Senior White House Correspondent
Jeff Pegues – Chief National Affairs and Justice Correspondent (2013–present)
Chip Reid – National Correspondent
Christina Ruffini – Foreign Affairs/ Washington Correspondent
Susan Spencer – Correspondent, 48 Hours and CBS News Sunday Morning (1977–present)
Ben  Tracy – Senior National and Environmental Correspondent (2019–present)
Cecilia​ Vega​ -​ Correspondent, 60 Minute​s​ (2023–present)

Atlanta
 Mark Strassmann – Correspondent

Chicago
 Charlie DeMar – Reporter, CBS Chicago/ WBBM-TV
 Adriana Diaz – Correspondent; Anchor, CBS Weekend News (Saturday)

Dallas
 Kris VanCleave – Correspondent
 Omar Villafranca – Correspondent

Houston
 Janet Shamlian – Correspondent

Los Angeles​ (West​ Coast​ Bureau)
Lee Cowan – Correspondent, CBS News Sunday Morning  (1996–2007; 2013–present)
Carter Evans – Correspondent
Lilia Luciano – Correspondent
Jonathan Vigliotti – Correspondent
Jamie Yuccas – Correspondent, KCAL-TV and​ KCBS-TV

Miami
 Manuel Bojorquez – Correspondent

London
Charlie D'Agata – Senior Foreign Correspondent (2011–present)
Ian Lee – Foreign Correspondent
Elizabeth Palmer – Foreign Correspondent (2000–present)
Mark Phillips – Senior Foreign Correspondent (1982–present)
Roxana Saberi – Foreign Correspondent
Imtiaz Tyab – Foreign Correspondent

Rome
Seth Doane – Foreign Correspondent/ Correspondent, ''60 Minutes+''
Chris Livesay – Foreign Correspondent

Johannesburg
Debora Patta – Foreign Correspondent

Istanbul
Holly Williams – Foreign Correspondent

Current contributors

Dr. David Agus – Medical Contributor
Serena Altschul – Contributing Correspondent, 60 Minutes
David Becker – Election Law Contributor
Luke Burbank – Correspondent, CBS News Sunday Morning
Alina Cho – Contributor, CBS News Sunday Morning
Anderson Cooper – Correspondent, 60 Minutes
Jeff Flake – Contributor
Nancy Giles – Contributor, CBS News Sunday Morning 
Steve Hartman – "On The Road" Correspondent, CBS Evening News 
Alexis Hoag – Legal Contributor 
Hua Hsu – Contributor, CBS News Sunday Morning
Rikki Klieman – Legal Analyst 
Conor Knighton – Correspondent, CBS News Sunday Morning 
Ted Koppel – Contributor, CBS News Sunday Morning
Ben Mankiewicz – Contributor, CBS News Sunday Morning
Wynton Marsalis – Cultural Correspondent
David Pogue – Correspondent, CBS News Sunday Morning 
Lonnie Quinn –  CBS Evening News Weather Contributor
Mo Rocca – Correspondent, CBS News Sunday Morning
Faith Salie – Contributor, CBS News Sunday Morning
Kelefa Sanneh – Contributor, CBS News Sunday Morning
Bob Schieffer – Political Contributor
Ben Stein – Contributor, CBS News Sunday Morning
Jamie Wax – Contributor
Jon Wertheim – Correspondent, 60 Minutes
Mark Whitaker – Contributor, CBS News Sunday Morning

Current radio personalities

Elaine Cobb – CBS News Radio Correspondent (based in Paris)
Pam Coulter – CBS News Radio Correspondent
Lucy Craft – CBS News Radio Correspondent (based in Tokyo)
Steve Dorsey – CBS News Radio Executive Editor
Pamela Falk – CBS News Radio Correspondent (based in New York)
Wendy Gillette – CBS News Radio Correspondent
Allison Keyes – Host, CBS News Weekend Roundup
Stacy Lyn – CBS News Radio Anchor/ Reporter
Cami McCormick – CBS News Radio National Security and Foreign Affairs Correspondent
Steven Portnoy – CBS News Radio White House Correspondent
Bill Rehkopf – CBS News Radio Correspondent

Current Newspath correspondents

Debra Alfarone – Correspondent (based in Washington, D.C.)
Danya Bacchus – Correspondent (based in Los Angeles)
Cristian Benavides – Correspondent (based in Miami)
Natalie Brand – Correspondent (based in Washington, D.C.)
Dina Demetrius – Correspondent (based in Los Angeles)
Michael George – Correspondent (based in New York)
Diane King Hall – MoneyWatch Correspondent (based in New York)
Tom Hanson – Correspondent (based in New York)
Skyler Henry – Correspondent (based in Washington, D.C.)
Nichelle Medina – Correspondent (based in Los Angeles)
Laura Podesta – Correspondent (based in New York)
Anthony Pura – Correspondent (based in Los Angeles)
Elise Preston – Correspondent (based in Los Angeles)
Femi Redwood – Correspondent (based in New York)
Naomi Ruchim – Correspondent (based in New York)

Past correspondents

Betsy Aaron
Jim Acosta – now at CNN
Jacqueline Adams +
Martin Agronsky +
Craig Allen (now at WCBS (AM) in New York City and News 12 Networks)
Bob Allison
David Andelman – now at CNN
Bob Arnot (later at NBC News and MSNBC)
Dr. Jennifer Ashton – now at ABC NewsThalia Assuras
Sharyl Attkisson
José Díaz-Balart – (now at Telemundo and at NBC News)
Roberta Baskin – (later at WJLA-TV in Washington, D.C.)
Nelson Benton +
Lowell Bergman – now retired
Derrick Blakley (later at WBBM-TV)
Regina Blakely
Cynthia Bowers
Betty Ann Bowser +
Ed Bradley (1971-2006)+
Ray Brady +
Marvin Breckinridge Patterson +
Heywood Hale Broun +
Cecil Brown +
Terrell Brown (now at WLS-TV in Chicago)
Mika Brzezinski – now at MSNBCWinston Burdett +
Ned Calmer +
Gretchen Carlson – later at Fox News
Julie Chen – host of Big BrotherSylvia Chase
Connie Chung (retired)
Lou Cioffi +
Blair Clark +
Mandy Clark
Michele Clark +
Jane Clayson (1999-2008; now at NPR)
Ron Cochran +
Charles Collingwood +
Victoria Corderi – now at NBC NewsKatie Couric (2006-2011; later at ABC News; now at Yahoo News]]
Walter Cronkite (1950-1980s)+
Frank Currier
Don Dahler 
John Charles Daly +
Faith Daniels
Randy Daniels
Priya David
Morton Dean (retired)
David Dick +
Nancy Dickerson +
Linda Douglass
Harold Dow (1972-2010)+
Bill Downs +
Kimberly Dozier (now at The Daily Beast and CNN)
Terry Drinkwater +
Jed Duvall
Douglas Edwards +
Eric Engberg +
Tom Fenton (now retired)
Giselle Fernández
John Ferrugia (now at Rocky Mountain PBS)
Murray Fromson +
Monica Gayle – now at WJBK (now retired)
Phyllis George +
Kendis Gibson – now at NBC News
Michelle Gielan
Christopher Glenn +
Bernard Goldberg (now at Fox News and at HBO Sports)
Julianna Goldman
Bianna Golodryga (now at CNN)
Fred Graham +
Jeff Greenfield (now at PBS)
Bryant Gumbel – now at HBO SportsTony Guida – now at CUNY TV
Bruce Hall
Nanette Hansen
John Hart (retired)
Celia Hatton
David Henderson
George Herman +
Erica Hill – now at HLNSandy Hill +
Don Hollenbeck +
Richard C. Hottelet +
Allan Jackson +
Rebecca Jarvis – now at ABC NewsWhit Johnson – now at ABC NewsPhil Jones
Gordon Joseloff
Bernard Kalb (retired)
Marvin Kalb (later at NBC News; now retired)
Peter Kalischer +
H.V. Kaltenborn +
Hattie Kauffman
Frank Kearns +
Alexander Kendrick +
Dana King (later at KPIX-TV in San Francisco; now retired)
Jeffrey Kofman (later at ABC News; now retired)
Steve Kroft (now retired)
Robert Krulwich (now at NPR)
Charles Kuralt +
Bill Kurtis (later at WBBM-TV in Chicago now retired)
John Laurence (later at ABC News)
Mola Lenghi (now at ABC News)
Bill Leonard +
Larry LeSueur +
Stan Levey
Lara Logan
Bill Lynch
Vicki Mabrey
Sheila MacVicar 
Maureen Maher
Paul Manning +
Carol Marin – now at WMAQ-TVChris Mavridis
Lark McCarthy
Melissa McDermott
Mark McEwen
Susan McGinnis
Derek McGinty – later at WUSAJim McKay (later at CBS Sports; and at ABC Sports)+
Bob McKeown (now at CBC News)
Bill McLaughlin
Marya McLaughlin +
Russ Mitchell – now at WKYCEdward P. Morgan +
Bruce Morton +
Bill Moyers – now at PBSRoger Mudd +
Edward R. Murrow +
Reena Ninan
Paul K. Niven Jr. +
Betty Nguyen – (later at NBC News and MSNBC; now at WPIX in New York City)
Deborah Norville – now weekday anchor, Inside EditionStuart Novins +
Bill O'Reilly (later at Fox News; now at Newsmax)
Charles Osgood (now retired)
Ike Pappas +
Terry Phillips
Robert Pierpoint +
Randall Pinkston (1990-2013; later at Al Jazeera America)
Byron Pitts now at ABC News
Bill Plante (1964-2016) +
George Polk +
Ned Potter (later at ABC News
Dave Price – now at WNBC
Jane Bryant Quinn
Sally Quinn
Bert Quint
Ed Rabel
Dan Rather – (1962–2006; now at AXS TV)
Harry Reasoner (1956-1970; 1978-1991)+
Trish Regan – most recently with Fox BusinessPaula Reid – now at CNN
Dean Reynolds 
Frank Reynolds (1953-1965; later at ABC News)+ 
Jane Robelot – now at WYFF-TV
John Roberts (later at CNN; now at Fox News)
Troy Roberts - (1993-2017; now at NBC News)
Norman Robinson (now retired)
Maggie Rodriguez (now with WFLA-TV in Tampa)
Andy Rooney (1949-1970; 1973-2011)+
Charlie Rose – co-anchor, CBS News Nightwatch, CBS This Morning and Person to Person (1984–1990; 2012–2017)
Richard Roth, (1972–2010) based in Moscow, Rome, Los Angeles, New York and London
Hughes Rudd +
Morley Safer – co-editor, 60 Minutes (1964-2016)+
Marlene Sanders +
Diane Sawyer – now at ABC NewsForrest Sawyer – (later at ABC News and then at MSNBC)
Stephen Schiff
David Schoenbrun +
Daniel Schorr +
David Schoumacher (later at ABC News; then at WJLA-TV in Washington, D.C.; now retired)
Barry Serafin – (later at ABC News; now retired)
Don Hewitt +
Eric Sevareid +
Bill Shadel +
Bernard Shaw (later at ABC News; then at CNN; now retired)
John Sheahan
Gary Shepard
William L. Shirer +
Lewis Shollenberger+
Maria Shriver – now at NBC NewsDaniel Sieberg
Bob Simon +
Bob Sirott
Harry Smith – now at NBC NewsHoward K. Smith +
Terence Smith (now retired)
Joan Snyder +
Bianca Solorzano
Hari Sreenivasan – now weekend anchor, PBS NewshourJohn Stehr – now main anchor at WTHRAlison Stewart (now at PBS)
Hannah Storm – now at ESPN and ESPN on ABCBill Stout +
Kathleen Sullivan (later at E! News)
Rene Syler (now at Aspire)
Lowell Thomas +
Richard Threlkeld +
Dallas Townsend +
Liz Trotta
Robert Trout +
Lem Tucker +
Meredith Vieira – later at NBC NewsMireya Villarreal (now at ABC News)
Alex Wagner
Richard Wagner
Jane Wallace
Kelly Wallace 
Mike Wallace +
Clarissa Ward – now at CNN
Chris Wragge – now at WCBS-TVNick Young (now retired)
Steve Young
Paula Zahn (later at CNN; now at Investigation Discovery'')
+ – deceased

Presidents of CBS News

Richard S. Salant (1961–1964)
Fred W. Friendly (1964–1966)
Richard S. Salant (1966–1979)
Bill Leonard (1979–1982)
Van Gordon Sauter (1982–1983)
Ed Joyce (1983–1986)
Van Gordon Sauter (1986)
Howard Stringer (1986–1988)
David W. Burke (1988–1990)
Eric Ober (1990–1996)
Andrew Heyward (1996–2005)
Sean McManus (2005–2011)
David Rhodes (2011–2019)
Susan Zirinsky (2019–2021)
Neeraj Khemlani (2021–present) (Co-Head)

Reporting partnerships
In 2017, CBS News entered into a content-sharing agreement with BBC News, respectively replacing similar arrangements with the BBC and ABC News, and CBS and Sky News (which was partially controlled by 21st Century Fox until 2018 when ownership was then transferred to Comcast). The partnership includes the ability to share resources, footage, and reports, and conduct "efficient planning of news gathering resources to increase the content of each broadcaster's coverage of world events".

Although they do not have an official partnership, CNN and CBS News share correspondents and contributors such as Anderson Cooper and Dr. Sanjay Gupta.

In 2022, CBS News entered into a content-sharing partnership with The Weather Channel, where The Weather Channel meteorologists will appear on CBS News programs, and CBS News correspondents will appear during live coverage of weather events on The Weather Channel.

See also
ABC News
NBC News
CNN
Fox News
Noticias Univision
Independent News Network
Bloomberg News
CBS News controversies and criticism

References

External links
 

 
CBS Television Network
Television news in the United States
Peabody Award winners